KakaoStory (Hangul: 카카오스토리) is a social network platform launched by Kakao. It was launched on March 22, 2012 as a photo sharing network but has then expanded to include others features allowing users to post various things on their page. As of 2017, KakaoStory has more active users in South Korea than Facebook.

References

External links
Official website
PC website

South Korean brands
Kakao
Social media
Image-sharing websites
South Korean social networking websites